Sir Henry Gibb, 1st Baronet (died 8 April 1650) was a Scottish courtier.

Family background
Gibb was the son of John Gibb (or Gib) of Knock and Isobel Lyndsay. His grandfather Robert Gibb had been a servant of James V of Scotland.

Career
He became a Groom of the Bedchamber to Prince Henry by 1606. After the Prince's death in 1612, he became a Gentleman of the bedchamber to James VI and I.

In September 1613 he was commissioned by King James to conduct a special mission to the Low Countries. Henry Gibb and Mr May travelled to Veere and Sluis to prevent Henry Howard, a son of the Earl of Suffolk fighting a duel with the Earl of Essex over issues concerning his sister Frances Howard and the annulment of her marriage.

Heney Gibb was involved in an incident in 1615 connected with the fall of the Scottish favourite, Robert Carr, 1st Earl of Somerset, who had married Frances Howard. He passed a letter and message from a Scottish man called Lumsden to Anne of Denmark's servant, his kinswoman Elizabeth Schaw, Mrs Murray. The letter misrepresented the trial of Weston, an officer at the Tower of London. The letter caused some offence to Anne of Denmark and difficulties for Scottish courtiers including Schaw's husband John Murray of the Bedchamber. The Countess of Eglinton heard about the affair and she wrote to the Murrays about Somerset, who she described as an "errant liar", who "wret to you and message sent with that ungret fullich cousing of yours, Herie Gib". He lost his place at court for a while.

An early biographer of King James, Arthur Wilson, included a version of these events, saying the letter or message carried by Henry Gibb was intended for King James. The letter from Lumsden described the actions of Richard Weston, the keeper of the Tower of London, and was critical of the lawyer Edward Coke. Francis Bacon said it was a libel and slander,

Gibb was at Theobalds during the final illness of King James in 1625. Mary Villiers, Countess of Buckingham and the Duke of Buckingham arranged some medical treatments for James, which caused controversy. Gibb criticised the Duke of Buckingham and was forced to leave court.

Gibb later served in the court of Charles I of England. In June 1634 Gibb was created a baronet, of Falkland and Carriber in the Baronetage of Nova Scotia. His title became extinct or dormant upon his death in 1650.

References

Year of birth uncertain
1650 deaths
17th-century Scottish people
Baronets in the Baronetage of Nova Scotia
Scottish courtiers